John P. Scripps Newspapers was an American newspaper chain founded by John P. Scripps, a grandson of E.W. Scripps, in 1928, and headquartered in San Diego. Its newspapers were concentrated in the western United States. The E. W. Scripps Company bought John P. Scripps in 1986.

Newspapers
Ventura County Star
The Tribune (San Luis Obispo)
Watsonville Register-Pajaronian
Tulare Advance-Register
Redding Record Searchlight
Kitsap Sun

E. W. Scripps Company
Newspaper companies of the United States
Companies based in San Diego
Publishing companies established in 1928
American companies established in 1928
1928 establishments in California
American companies disestablished in 1986
1986 disestablishments in California